Simba Nagpal (born 25 September 1996) is an Indian actor and model who predominantly works in Hindi television. He is best known for his debut portrayal of Virat Singh in Colors TV's popular Shakti Astitva Ke Ehsaas Ki (2020-21). Nagpal also portrayed male protagonist Rishabh Gujral in Colors TV's supernatural franchise Naagin 6.

In 2021, he was seen as contestant on Colors TV's reality show Bigg Boss 15.

Life and education 
Nagpal was born on 25 September 1996 in Delhi, India. He completed his secondary education in Sushant School of Art and Architecture. He later completed his bachelor's in Ansal University, Gurgaon.

Career 
Nagpal made his first appearance in the reality show, MTV Splitsvilla 11 in 2018 as a contestant and ended up at 8th place. In 2019, he auditioned for another reality show, MTV Roadies but didn't qualify the culling round. Following the same year, Nagpal made his acting debut with a leading role as Virat Singh in Colors TV's soap opera Shakti - Astitva Ke Ehsaas Ki opposite Jigyasa Singh in the 16 year leap.

After the show ended in 2021, he participated in Colors TV's reality show Bigg Boss 15 though he finished at 16th place, but his instinct in the house was praised by host Salman Khan and called him "You're moving ahead with dignity and dignified way".

In 2022, Nagpal joined Balaji Telefilms thriller supernatural franchise Naagin for its sixth season where he portrayed the male protagonist Rishabh Gujral in Naagin 6 opposite Tejasswi Prakash. Initially it received criticism because of story, however later winning hearts especially for the chemistry between lead pairs and gained better ratings itself. In December 2022, he quit the show after the leap.

Filmography

Television

Special appearances

See also 
 List of Indian television actors

References

External links 

 
 

Indian actors
Indian models
1996 births
Living people